Heavy Crown may refer to:

 "Heavy Crown" (song), of 2014 by Iggy Azalea featuring Ellie Goulding from the album Reclassified
 Heavy Crown (album), of 2016
 "Heavy Crown", a song by Trixie Mattel from the soundtrack of Trixie Mattel: Moving Parts